Acrocercops leuconota is a moth of the family Gracillariidae, known from Colombia. It was described by P.C. Zeller in 1877.

References

leuconota
Moths of South America
Moths described in 1877